The Piano Sonata in D-flat major D 568 (also known under its former  number 567), composed in June 1817 by Franz Schubert, is an early version of his Piano Sonata in E-flat major D 568.

Movements
I. Allegro moderato

D-flat major

II. Andante molto

C-sharp minor

III. Allegretto

D-flat major. Fragment (ends in the middle of the closing theme), although the missing material can be readily produced by transposing the parallel passage of the E-flat major sonata.

Notes

Sources

Piano sonatas by Franz Schubert
1817 compositions
Compositions in D-flat major